Cyperus longifolius is a species of sedge that is native to the islands Madagascar, Mauritius, and Réunion.

See also 
 List of Cyperus species

References 

longifolius
Taxa named by Jean Louis Marie Poiret
Plants described in 1806
Flora of Madagascar
Flora of Mauritius
Flora of Réunion